Daszyna  is a village in Łęczyca County, Łódź Voivodeship, in central Poland. It is the seat of the gmina (administrative district) called Gmina Daszyna.

The village has an approximate population of 600.

References

Daszyna
Kalisz Governorate
Łódź Voivodeship (1919–1939)